Megachurch Murder is a 2015 American television film directed by Darin Scott and starring Tamala Jones, Shanica Knowles and Malcolm-Jamal Warner.

Cast
Malcolm-Jamal Warner as Hamilton Spears
Shanica Knowles as Hannah Spears
Tamala Jones as Martha Spears
Michael Beach as Clay King
Corbin Bleu as Marcus King
Dawnn Lewis as Lucille Williams
Santana Dempsey as Harlow Gillman
Romeo Miller as Oliver King
Patrick Cage as Lance King
Nic Robuck as Bobby Stantz

References

External links
 
 

2015 films
American drama television films
Films directed by Darin Scott
2010s American films